Traffic from Paradise is the seventh album by the musician Rickie Lee Jones, released in September 1993.

Track listing
All songs written by Rickie Lee Jones, except where noted.

 "Pink Flamingos" – 6:31
 "Altar Boy" – 2:27
 "Stewart's Coat" – 4:31
 "Beat Angels" (Sal Bernardi) – 4:11
 "Tigers" – 5:48
 "Rebel Rebel" (David Bowie) – 4:39
 "Jolie Jolie" – 4:26
 "Running from Mercy" (Jones, Leo Kottke) – 6:01
 "A Stranger's Car" – 2:53
 "The Albatross" (Jones, Kottke, John Leftwich) – 3:12

Personnel
 Rickie Lee Jones – vocals, acoustic guitar, mandolin, keyboards, bowed dulcimer, arrangements, backing vocals
 John Leftwich – musical director, bass, cello, acoustic guitar on "Tigers", backing vocals on "Stewart's Coat" and "Running from Mercy"
 Sal Bernardi – acoustic guitar, backing vocals on "Stewart's Coat" and "Running from Mercy"
 Leo Kottke – 6-string, 12-string, slide acoustic guitar, backing vocals on "Running from Mercy"
 David Hidalgo – 8-string electric guitar, backing vocals on "Beat Angels"
 Brian Setzer – electric guitar on "Rebel Rebel", backing vocals on "Beat Angels" and "Rebel Rebel"
 Dean Parks – electric guitar on "Tigers"
 David Baerwald – electric guitar on "Beat Angels", backing vocals on "The Albatross"
 Jim Keltner – drums
 Alex Acuña – drums, congas on "Tigers"
 Brad Dutz – percussion, marimba, tarkas, bodhrán, udu, mixing bowls on "Rebel Rebel"
 Efrain Toro – percussion on "Pink Flamingos" and "Stewart's Coat"
 Bobby Bruce – violin
 Douglas Lyons – French horn
 Syd Straw – backing vocals on "Beat Angels" and "Rebel Rebel"
Lyle Lovett – backing vocals on "Running from Mercy"
 Teresa Tudury – backing vocals on "Running from Mercy"
Technical
John Cutcliffe – executive producer
Julie Last – engineer, mixing
Charles Stewart Parker – artwork, cover, illustrations
Charlotte Rose – painting on back of sleeve

References

Rickie Lee Jones albums
1993 albums
Geffen Records albums